Calosoma palmeri is a species of ground beetle in the subfamily of Carabinae. It was described by George Henry Horn in 1876.

References

palmeri
Beetles described in 1876